Charles Barrington Goode AC (born 26 August 1938) is a prominent Australian director of public companies.  He resides in Melbourne.

Goode attended Scotch College, Melbourne and is a graduate of the University of Melbourne, completing a Bachelor of Commerce (Hons).  He also received an MBA and LLD (Hons) from that University and an LLD (Hons) from Monash University.

After an early career at the establishment stockbroking firm Potter Partners, he has had a long career as a director and Chairman of major public companies.  His positions have included
Chairman of ANZ Bank (1995-2010)
Chairman of Woodside Petroleum (1999-2007) (non-executive director since 1988)
Director of Singapore Airlines (1999-2006)
Chairman of Australian United Investment Company Limited
Chairman of Diversified United Investment Limited
Chairman of the Ian Potter Foundation
President of the Howard Florey Institute of Experimental Physiology and Medicine (1997-2004; director since 1987).

He became a Companion of the Order of Australia in 2001.

References

Institute of Company Directors

Mayne Report

1938 births
Living people
Australia and New Zealand Banking Group
Businesspeople from Melbourne
University of Melbourne alumni
Companions of the Order of Australia
People educated at Scotch College, Melbourne